The Greater Kansas City Golf Classic was a golf tournament on the Champions Tour from 1987 to 2006. The tournament which first took place in Oklahoma, was last played in Overland Park, Kansas at The Nicklaus Golf Club at LionsGate.

The purse for the 2006 tournament was US$1,650,000, with $248,000 going to the winner. The tournament was founded in 1987 as the Silver Pages Classic.

Winners
Greater Kansas City Golf Classic
2006 Dana Quigley

Bayer Advantage Classic
2005 Dana Quigley

Bayer Advantage Celebrity Pro-Am
2004 Allen Doyle
2003 Jay Sigel

TD Waterhouse Championship
2002 Bruce Lietzke
2001 Ed Dougherty
2000 Dana Quigley
1999 Allen Doyle

Saint Luke's Classic
1998 Larry Ziegler
1997 Bruce Summerhays

VFW Senior Championship
1996 Dave Eichelberger
1995 Bob Murphy

Southwestern Bell Classic
1994 Jim Colbert
1993 Dave Stockton
1992 Gibby Gilbert
1991 Jim Colbert
1990 Jimmy Powell
1989 Bobby Nichols
1988 Gary Player

Silver Pages Classic
1987 Chi-Chi Rodríguez

References

Former PGA Tour Champions events
Golf in Kansas
Golf in Oklahoma
Sports in the Kansas City metropolitan area
Recurring sporting events established in 1987
Recurring sporting events disestablished in 2006
1987 establishments in Oklahoma
2006 disestablishments in Kansas